Nemaconia is a genus of flowering plants belonging to the family Orchidaceae.

Its native range is Mexico to Southern Tropical America.

Species:

Nemaconia dressleriana 
Nemaconia glomerata 
Nemaconia graminifolia 
Nemaconia longipetala 
Nemaconia pellita 
Nemaconia striata

References

Ponerinae (plant)
Orchid genera